Bernhard Lehmann (born 11 January 1948 in Großräschen, Brandenburg) is an East German bobsledder who competed from the late 1970s to the late 1980s. Competing in three Winter Olympics, he won four medals with one gold (Four-man: 1976), two silvers (Two-man and four-man: both 1984), and one bronze (Two-man: 1988).

Lehmann also won two medals in the four-man event at the FIBT World Championships with a gold in 1985 and a silver in 1982.

References

 Bobsleigh four-man Olympic medalists for 1924, 1932–56, and since 1964
 Bobsleigh four-man world championship medalists since 1930

External links
 
 

1948 births
Living people
People from Großräschen
German male bobsledders
Sportspeople from Brandenburg
National People's Army military athletes
Olympic bobsledders of East Germany
Bobsledders at the 1976 Winter Olympics
Bobsledders at the 1984 Winter Olympics
Bobsledders at the 1988 Winter Olympics
Olympic gold medalists for East Germany
Olympic silver medalists for East Germany
Olympic bronze medalists for East Germany
Olympic medalists in bobsleigh
Medalists at the 1984 Winter Olympics
Medalists at the 1988 Winter Olympics
Medalists at the 1976 Winter Olympics
Recipients of the Patriotic Order of Merit in gold